The Franklin Pierce Ravens are the intercollegiate athletic teams that represent Franklin Pierce University, located in Rindge, New Hampshire, in NCAA sporting competitions. Franklin Pierce competes at the Division II level in 22 varsity sports.

In terms of conferences, the Ravens are primarily members of the Northeast-10 Conference, of which it has been a member since 2000. The three exceptions are the women's bowling team, which is a member of the East Coast Conference; the women's ice hockey team, which competes at the National Collegiate (Division I) level in the New England Women's Hockey Alliance (NEWHA); and the women's rowing team, which competes as an independent.

Varsity teams

List of teams

Men's sports (10)
Baseball
Basketball
Cross country
Football
Golf
Ice hockey
Lacrosse
Soccer
Tennis
Track and field

Women's sports (13)
Basketball
Cross country
Field hockey
Golf
Ice hockey
Lacrosse
Rowing
Soccer
Softball
Swimming and diving
Tennis
Track and field
Volleyball

Facilities
Athletic facilities on the Rindge campus include Melissa Bisaccia Memorial Softball Complex, Dr. Arthur and Martha Pappas Field, Sodexo Field, the Franklin Pierce Fieldhouse, and the Grimshaw-Gudewicz Activity Center at Northfields.

National championships
The women's soccer team has won five national championships (1994, 1995, 1996, 1997, 1999), and the men's soccer team won the 2007 national championship. The women's basketball team has won three regional championships.

Team (5)

References

External links